Beaumontois-en-Périgord (literally Beaumontois in Périgord) is a commune in the Dordogne department of southwestern France. The municipality was established on 1 January 2016 and consists of the former communes of Beaumont-du-Périgord, Labouquerie, Nojals-et-Clotte and Sainte-Sabine-Born.

See also 
Communes of the Dordogne department

References 

Communes of Dordogne